Arthur Nicolson may refer to:

Arthur Nicolson, 1st Baron Carnock (1849–1928), diplomat
the name of several Nicolson baronets

See also
Arthur D. Nicholson, military intelligence officer